Wild Hive Farm is a farm and mill located in Clinton Corners, New York. It was founded to promote sustainable agriculture in the Hudson Valley through grain-based local agriculture.

Wild Hive Farm was founded by Don Lewis in 1982. He was a former professional beekeeper and slowly built a modest empire of whole grains and organic flours amid the waves of grain in the rolling terrain of Dutchess County, in the mid-Hudson Valley. He started by selling honey based baked goods and other products at Union Square Greenmarket in New York. 

The Wild Hive Farm Bakery began in Lewis' kitchen, where he experimented with producing local and tasty baked goods. Soon after, Wild Hive Farm Store, and Café Bakery opened and began serving customers. As sales of flour and milled products increased, Lewis started the Wild Hive Farm Community Grain Project

Lewis plans to expand the offerings of the Wild Hive Community Grain project as time goes on and to use the Farm's facilities as a means of teach sustainable agriculture.

References

Sources

External links 
 

Farms in New York (state)
1982 establishments in New York (state)
Buildings and structures in Dutchess County, New York